Pembroke School may refer to:

Pembroke School, Adelaide, a school in Adelaide, South Australia
Pembroke School, Wales, a school in Pembrokeshire
Pembroke School, New Zealand, a school in Pembroke, New Zealand

See also
Pembroke College (disambiguation)